Thomas West, 2nd and 11th Baron De La Warr (c. 1550 – 24 March 1601/1602) of Wherwell Abbey, Hampshire, was a member of Elizabeth I's Privy Council.

Biography
Thomas West was the eldest son of William West, 1st Baron De La Warr, by his first wife, Elizabeth Strange, the daughter of Thomas Strange of Chesterton, Gloucestershire. He succeeded his father, who had been created Baron De La Warr and died in 1595, by letters patent in 1597.

He was a Member (MP) of the Parliament of England for Yarmouth, Isle of Wight in 1586 and for  Aylesbury in 1593. He was knighted in 1587. It is probable, though uncertain, that he had previously represented Chichester in the 1571 Parliament and East Looe in the 1572 Parliament.

From 1590 to his death he was one of the two Chamberlains of the Exchequer.

In 1597 he petitioned the House of Lords to have the precedence of the original barony, 1299, on the basis that he actually held the ancient peerage. After his claim was admitted, he sometimes referred to himself as 11th Baron.

Family
West married, on 19 November 1571, Anne Knollys, daughter of Sir Francis Knollys and Catherine Carey, daughter of William Carey, esquire, by whom he had six sons and eight daughters:

Sir Robert West, who married, about 1592, Elizabeth Cocke, daughter of Henry Cocke of Broxbourne, Hertfordshire, and predeceased his father. After West's death, his widow married Sir Robert Oxenbridge.
Thomas West, 3rd Baron De La Warr (7 July 1577 – c. February 1624), who married Cecily Shirley, youngest daughter of Sir Thomas Shirley and Anne Kempe, daughter of Sir Thomas Kempe of Olantigh, Kent.
Walsingham West.
Francis West (28 October 1586 – c.1634), esquire, Governor of Virginia, who emigrated to Virginia, and married firstly, before 6 February 1626, Margaret, widow of Edward Blayney, by whom he had a son, Francis West, and a daughter, Elizabeth West, and secondly, on 31 March 1628, Temperance Flowerdew (d. December 1628), widow of Sir George Yeardley, Governor of Virginia, daughter of Anthony Flowerdew of Hethersett, Norfolk, by Martha Stanley.
John West (14 December 1590 – 1659), Governor of Virginia, who emigrated to Virginia, and married Anne Percy, by whom he had one son, John West.
Lieutenant Colonel Nathaniel West (30 November 1592 – 7 June 1618), who emigrated to Virginia, where in 1621 he married Frances Greville (d.1634), by whom he had a son, Nathaniel West. His widow married secondly Abraham Peirsey, esquire (d. 16 January 1628), and thirdly Captain Samuel Mathews, esquire (died c. March 1658). (Edit: Date of death or date of marriage is wrong.) 
Elizabeth West (11 September 1573 – 15 January 1633), who married at Wherwell, Hampshire, on 12 February 1594, as his second wife, Herbert Pelham (c.1546 – 12 April 1620), esquire, a widower with two sons and a daughter by his first wife, Katherine Thatcher, by whom she had three sons and six daughters.
Lettice West (b. 1579), who married Henry Ludlow.
Anne West (b. 13 February 1588), who married firstly, by licence dated 30 August 1608, John Pellatt (d. 22 October 1625), esquire, of Bolney, Sussex, by whom she had three daughters; secondly Christopher Swale (d. 7 September 1645), by whom she had a son, Christopher, and a daughter, Elizabeth; and thirdly Leonard Lechford (died c. 29 November 1673), by whom she had no issue.
Penelope West (9 September 1582 – c.1619), who married, about 1599, as his first wife, Herbert Pelham (c.1580 – 13 July 1624)), esquire, of Hastings, Sussex, stepson of Penelope West's elder sister, Elizabeth, by whom she had five sons and four daughters.
Katherine West (b. 1583), who married Nickolas Strelley of Nottinghamshire.
Helen West (b. 15 December 1587), who married Sir William Savage of Winchester, Hampshire, by whom she had a son, John Savage, and two daughters, Cecily and Anne.
Anne Hannah West (again) who married George Merriman (b. 1559) on 24 Aug 1610.
Elizabeth West (again), who married Sir Richard Saltonstall of Huntwick Grange, near Nostell, Yorkshire.

Ancestry

Notes

References
 

1550s births
1603 deaths
People from Wherwell
Thomas West, 02 Baron De La Warr
16th-century English nobility
17th-century English nobility
Members of the Privy Council of England
Members of the pre-1707 English Parliament for constituencies in Cornwall
English MPs 1586–1587
English MPs 1593
Knights Bachelor
Barons De La Warr